Ernest Robert Whitcombe (17 October 1890 – 14 July 1971) was an English professional golfer. Over the course of his career he had nine wins in professional tournaments and was runner-up in the 1924 Open Championship.

Early life
Whitcombe was born in Berrow, Burnham-on-Sea, Somerset. He was the eldest of the three Whitcombe brothers who were all successful English professional golfers in the 1920s and 1930s.

Golf career
He was runner-up in the 1924 Open Championship, carding rounds of 77-70-77-78=302, and finished just one shot behind Walter Hagen. The excellent 70 in round two was the best score in a single round by any competitor in the top 10. He won the Irish and Dutch Opens in 1928, the French Open in 1930 and the Irish Open again in 1935. He also won the 1924 News of the World Match Play.

Family
His two younger brothers Charles and Reg were also professional golfers. Ernest played with his brother Charles in the 1929 and 1931 Ryder Cups and all three played together in the 1935 Ryder Cup. His son, Eddie Whitcombe, was also a professional golfer.

World War I
During World War I he joined the Royal Field Artillery as a gunner attached to the 16th Division of Kitchener's Army. Whitcombe saw combat at Hulluch, Guillemont, Messines and Ypres and suffered slight wounds from a machine-gun burst. He was hit by a small piece of shrapnel which became lodged in his left eye—an injury which may have adversely affected his putting in later years. For his war service, he was awarded the British War Medal and the Victory Medal.

Death and legacy
Whitcombe died on 14 July 1971 in Bury St Edmunds, Suffolk, England. He was one of the top English golfers in the period from 1924 through 1937.

Professional wins
Note: This list may be incomplete
1920 West of England Professional Championship
1924 News of the World Match Play
1927 Yorkshire Evening News Tournament
1928 Irish Open, Dutch Open
1930 French Open
1931 Yorkshire Evening News Tournament
1934 Dunlop-Metropolitan Tournament
1935 Irish Open
1937 News Chronicle Tournament

Results in major championships

Note: Whitcombe only played in the U.S. Open and The Open Championship.

NT = No tournament
WD = withdrew
CUT = missed the half-way cut
"T" indicates a tie for a place

Team appearances
Great Britain vs USA (representing Great Britain): 1926 (winners)
Ryder Cup (representing Great Britain): 1929 (winners), 1931, 1935
France–Great Britain Professional Match (representing Great Britain): 1929 (winners)
England–Ireland Professional Match (representing England): 1933 (winners)

References

Further reading

English male golfers
Ryder Cup competitors for Europe
British Army personnel of World War I
Royal Field Artillery soldiers
People from Burnham-on-Sea
1890 births
1971 deaths